In 1836, at least nine ships in 1836 carried the first European settlers from England to the south coast of Australia for the establishment of the City of Adelaide and the province of South Australia. 
Although not all of the ships sailed together, they have been referred to as the "First Fleet of South Australia", as all were carrying the founding planners and administrators of the new colony as well as the first emigrants, and all were represented at the proclamation of the new province.

People
After a historic meeting at Exeter Hall on 30 June 1834, where the principles, objects, plan and prospects of the new Colony of South Australia were explained to the public, hundreds of enquiries from prospective immigrants started to arrive at the South Australian Association's headquarters in London.

The ships that sailed in 1836 would carry prospective emigrants as well as staff employed by the South Australian Company, a private business enterprise, and various appointees of the British Government to set up the new British Province of South Australia. Under the emigration scheme, labouring classes received free passage. They had to be between 15 and 30 years of age, preferably married, and needed two references. Steerage passengers paid £15-20, middle berth £35-40, and cabin class £70. Children under 14 years were charged £3 while those under 1 year were free.

Ships
In January 1836 four ships sailed from England on behalf of the South Australian Company, ahead of the planned expedition by the South Australian Colonization Commission, the board set up under the South Australia Act 1834. They developed a settlement at Kingscote on Kangaroo Island, in July 1836, but when farming proved unviable, both the settlement and the Company's operations were moved to the mainland.

Four of the ships were sent by the South Australian Company, three were chartered by the Colonization Commission, and the other two chartered privately. The ships began sailing from England in 1836 from January until about June, and arrived on the South Australian coast (all but one initially landing on Kangaroo Island) from July to December that year, with the new province proclaimed on 28 December at Glenelg.

It is difficult for scholars to arrive at a definitive list of pioneer ships given the lack of extant primary evidence due to poor record keeping and accidental loss of records. The following list is based on the best available records, ordered chronologically by date of arrival in South Australia.

Table notes

See also
British colonisation of South Australia
History of South Australia
South Australian Company

References

Further reading

Passenger lists
 
 PDF This thesis lists all passengers of six ships (it excludes Africaine, Buffalo and Tam O' Shanter), including occupations, and examines their and their descendants' social mobility after arrival.
 
 Links to the lists for 6 ships (excluding Africaine, Buffalo and Tam O' Shanter).
 Lists all passengers and crew on all ships.

Other
 Article about a booklet entitled Kangaroo Island. The tragedy of Dr. Slater and Mr Osborne, by Dr. A. A. Lendon, which was published in the Kangaroo Island Courier in parts from December 1926 to January 1927. Reproduced in full here by the Kangaroo Island Pioneers Association.

History of South Australia

History of immigration to Australia